"Brown Bess" is a nickname of uncertain origin for the British Army's muzzle-loading smoothbore flintlock Land Pattern Musket and its derivatives. The musket design remained in use for over a hundred years with many incremental changes in its design. These versions include the Long Land Pattern, the Short Land Pattern, the India Pattern, the New Land Pattern Musket and the Sea Service Musket.

The Long Land Pattern musket and its derivatives, all 0.75 inch calibre flintlock muskets, were the standard long guns of the British Empire's land forces from 1722 until 1838, when they were superseded by a percussion cap smoothbore musket. The British Ordnance System converted many flintlocks into the new percussion system known as the Pattern 1839 Musket. A fire in 1841 at the Tower of London destroyed many muskets before they could be converted. Still, the Brown Bess saw service until the middle of the nineteenth century.

Most male citizens of the thirteen colonies of British America were required by law to own arms and ammunition for militia duty. The Long Land Pattern was a common firearm in use by both sides in the American War of Independence.

In 1808 during the Napoleonic Wars, the United Kingdom subsidised Sweden (during the Sweden–Finland period) in various ways as the British government anxiously wanted to keep an ally in the Baltic Sea region. These included deliveries of significant numbers of Brown Bess-muskets for use in the Finnish War of 1808 to 1809.

During the Musket Wars (1820s–30s), Māori warriors used Brown Besses purchased from European traders at the time. Some muskets were sold to the Mexican Army, which used them during the Texas Revolution of 1836 and the Mexican–American War of 1846 to 1848. Brown Besses saw service in the First Opium War and during the Indian rebellion of 1857. Zulu warriors, who had also purchased them from European traders, used them during the Anglo-Zulu War in 1879. One was even used in the Battle of Shiloh in 1862, during the American Civil War.

Origins of the name

One hypothesis is that the "Brown Bess" was named after Elizabeth I of England, but this lacks support. Jonathan Ferguson, Firearms Curator of the Royal Armouries, traces the name to at least the 1760s, and his research suggests the name was adopted from slang for a mistress, prostitute, or lowly woman who also appear in period sources referred to as "Brown Bess". He writes, Bess' was a generic and sometimes derogatory name, a bit like 'Sheila' in modern Australian English", and "brown" simply meant plain or drab. Ferguson discounts, with evidence, many of the other theories previously popular.

Early uses of the term include the newspaper, the Connecticut Courant in April 1771, which said: "... but if you are afraid of the sea, take Brown Bess on your shoulder and march." This familiar use indicates widespread use of the term by that time. The 1785 Dictionary of the Vulgar Tongue, a contemporary work that defined vernacular and slang terms, contained this entry: "Brown Bess: A soldier's firelock. To hug Brown Bess; to carry a fire-lock, or serve as a private soldier." Military and government records of the time do not use this poetical name but refer to firelocks, flintlock, muskets or by the weapon's model designations.

Popular explanations of the use of the word "Brown" include that it was a reference to either the colour of the walnut stocks, or to the characteristic brown colour that was produced by russeting, an early form of metal treatment. However, in the case of russeting at least, the Oxford English Dictionary (OED) and Ferguson note that "browning" was only introduced in the early 19th century, well after the term had come into general use. Others argue that mass-produced weapons of the time were coated in brown varnish on metal parts as a rust preventative and on wood as a sealer (or in the case of unscrupulous contractors, to disguise inferior or non-regulation types of wood), an entirely different thing from russeting.

Similarly, the word "Bess" is commonly held to either derive from the word arquebus or blunderbuss (predecessors of the musket) or to be a reference to Elizabeth I, possibly given to commemorate her death. The OED has citations for "brown musket" dating back to the early 18th century that refer to the same weapon. Another suggestion is that the name is simply the counterpart to the earlier Brown Bill. However, the origin of the name may be much simpler, if vulgar.

Kipling may have based his poem on an earlier but similar "Brown Bess" poem published in "Flights of Fancy" (No. 16) in 1792. Of course, the name could have been initially inspired by the older term of the "Brown Bill" and perhaps the barrels were originally varnished brown, but it is well known in literary circles that the name "Brown Bess" during the period in question in the 17th to early 19th centuries is not a reference to a color or a weapon but to simply refer to a wanton prostitute (or harlot). Such a nickname would have been a delight to the soldiers of the era who were from the lower classes of English and then British society. So far, the earliest use noted so far of the term "Brown Bess" was in a 1631 publication, John Done's Polydoron: or A Mescellania of Morall, Philosophicall, and Theological Sentences, page 152:

The Land Pattern muskets

From the seventeenth century to the early years of the eighteenth century, most nations did not specify standards for military firearms. Firearms were individually procured by officers or regiments as late as 1745, and were often custom-made to the tastes of the purchaser. As the firearm gained ascendancy on the battlefield, this lack of standardisation led to increasing difficulties in the supply of ammunition and repair materials. To address these difficulties, armies began to adopt standardised "patterns". A military service selected a "pattern musket" to be stored in a "pattern room". There it served as a reference for arms makers, who could make comparisons and take measurements to ensure that their products matched the standard.

Stress-bearing parts of the Brown Bess, such as the barrel, lockwork, and sling-swivels, were customarily made of iron, while other furniture pieces such as the butt plate, trigger guard and ramrod pipe were found in both iron and brass. The weapon did not have sights, although the bayonet lug doubled as a crude front sight.

The earliest models had iron fittings, but these were replaced by brass in models built after 1736. Wooden ramrods were used with the first guns but were replaced by iron ones, although guns with wooden scouring sticks were still issued to troops on American service until 1765 and later to loyalist units in the American Revolution. Wooden ramrods, also called scouring sticks, were also used in the Dragoon version produced from 1744 to 1771 for Navy and Marine use.

The accuracy of the Brown Bess was fair, as with most other muskets. In 1811, in London, a test shooting was conducted at the site. The target was a wooden shield the size of an infantry or a cavalry line. The results of the practice were as follows: at a distance of  53% hits,  30% hits,  23% hits. The accuracy of the Brown Bess was in line with most other smoothbore muskets of the 18th to 19th centuries. But it should be borne in mind that this is the result of shooting by ordinary soldiers who had little training. Soldiers of light infantry had more training, and were taught accurate shooting.

The Brown Bess was used not only in the line infantry, but also light infantry, as well as Rogers' Rangers, hunters, skirmishers, Indians and many other irregular troops who used non-standard tactics.

The Brown Bess's bullet was lethal at its full effective range. In the mid-18th century, Robertson measured the speed of musket bullets on a ballistic pendulum. According to him, the speed of a round musket bullet slug was about 1804 feet per second (550 m/s). That is, the muzzle energy of the musket was about 3,500 to 4,000 joules, which is comparable to the energy of modern rifle cartridges. Modern ballistic tests have confirmed these data.

British soldiers armed with Brown Besses preferred to reduce the standard number of steps for loading a musket. To this end, they would drop the cartridge into the barrel and strike the butt on the ground, to seat the load without the use of a scouring stick. This approximately doubled their rate of fire.

Besides not having fore-sights, Brown Bess-muskets were virtually identical to Potzdam muskets up until the Prussian 1809 pattern.

Variations

Many variations and modifications of the standard pattern musket were created over its long history. It was later found that shortening the barrel did not detract from accuracy but made handling easier, giving rise to the Militia (or Marine) Pattern of 1756 and the Short Land Pattern of 1768, which both had a  barrel. Another version with a  barrel was first manufactured for the British East India Company, and was eventually adopted by the British Army in 1790 as the India Pattern.

Towards the end of the life of the weapon, there was a change in the system of ignition. The flintlock mechanism, which was prone to misfiring, especially in wet weather, was replaced by the more reliable percussion cap. The last flintlock pattern manufactured was selected for conversion to the new system as the Pattern 1839. As a fire at the Tower of London destroyed large stocks of these in 1841, a new Pattern 1842 musket was manufactured. These remained in service until the 1853 outbreak of the Crimean War, when they were replaced by the Minié and the P53 Enfield rifled musket.

See also
 British military rifles
 Carbine
 French Land Pattern Musket
 Historical reenactment
 List of infantry weapons in the American Revolution
 List of wars involving England
 List of wars involving Great Britain
 List of wars involving the United Kingdom
 Spanish Land Pattern Musket
 Military history of Britain
 Military history of England
 Military history of the United Kingdom
 Musket
 Prussian Land Pattern Musket
 Rifle
 American Land Pattern Musket
 Swedish Land Pattern Musket

Citations

General bibliography
 Cumpston, Mike. "The guns of empire: 18th century martial muskets". Guns, August 2008, p. 60. FMG Publications, San Diego, CA
 Reid, Stuart. British Redcoat (2) 1793—1815. Warrior series. Osprey Publishing. . .

External links

 Detailed Brown Bess Images and Information. Correct Source of Images with Blue Background.
 Brown Bess—Musket Misconception
 Kipling's poem "Brown Bess"
 Brown Bess Musket: Three shots in 46 seconds (video)
 Live Fire (Brown Bess) Volley at 60 yards www.kings8th.com (video)
 (Brown Bess) Musket Firing Demonstration Part 1 (Minuteman National Park) (video)
 (Brown Bess) Musket Firing Demonstration Part 2 (Minuteman National Park) (video)
 How to fire a Brown Bess musket—English Heritage (video)
 Brown Bess Flintlock Musket Accuracy—updated (Australia) (video)
 Swedish subsidy musket from the United Kingdom #1—Swedish Army Museum (image)
 Swedish subsidy musket from the United Kingdom #2—Swedish Army Museum (image)

18th-century weapons
19th-century weapons
British Army equipment
Military equipment of the Early Modern period
Military equipment of the late modern period
Muskets
War of 1812
Weapons and ammunition introduced in 1722
Weapons of the United Kingdom